This is a timeline of women's suffrage in Wisconsin. Women's suffrage efforts began before the Civil War. The first Wisconsin state constitutional convention in 1846 discussed both women's suffrage and African-American suffrage. In the end, a more conservative constitution was adopted by Wisconsin. In the 1850s, a German language women's rights newspaper was founded in Milwaukee and many suffragists spoke throughout the state. The first state suffrage convention was held in Janesville in 1867. The 1870s, several women's suffrage groups were founded in the state. In 1884, a women's suffrage bill, allowing women to vote for school-related issues is passed. In 1886, voters approve the school-related suffrage bill in a referendum. The first year women vote, 1887, there are challenges to the law that go on until Wisconsin women are allowed to vote again for school issues in 1902 using separate ballots. In the 1900s, women's suffrage conventions continue to take place throughout the state. Women collect petitions and continue to lobby the state legislature. In 1911 Wisconsin legislature passes a bill for women's suffrage that will go out to the voters in 1912. On November 4, 1912 voters disapprove of women's suffrage. Women's suffrage efforts continue, including sponsoring a suffrage school and with the inclusion of a National Woman's Party (NWP) chapter formed in 1915. When the Nineteenth Amendment goes out to the states, Wisconsin ratifies on June 10 and turns in the ratification paperwork first, on June 13, 1919.

19th century

1840s 
1846

 October 5: Delegates of the 1846 Wisconsin Constitutional Convention start meeting in Madison. The final draft of the constitution had women's rights provisions and considered suffrage for African Americans.
 April: This version of the Wisconsin Constitution is rejected by voters.

1850s 
1852

 Woman's rights newspaper, Die Deutsche Frauen-Zeitung, is founded in Milwaukee by Mathilde Franziska Anneke.

1853

 Clarina I. H. Nichols and Lydia Folger Fowler tour Wisconsin and speak on temperance and women's suffrage.

1855

 November: Lucy Stone speaks about women's suffrage in Madison and Kenosha.

1856

 Women's suffrage club started in Richland Center.
Three women's suffrage petitions are brought to the state legislature by Senator C. C. Sholes of Kenosha County.

1860s 
1867

 October 9–10: First state suffrage convention is held in Janesville.

1868

 The Woman Suffrage Association of Wisconsin (WSAW) is founded.

1869

 February 24–25: State suffrage convention is held in Milwaukee and arranged by Lila Peckham and Laura Ross Wolcott.

1870s 
1870

 State suffrage convention is held.

1878

 The Madison Equal Suffrage Association (MESA) is founded.
1879

 Organization of the Marathon County Woman Suffrage Association.

1880s 
1880

 May: Mukwonago Woman Suffrage Club is organized.
A women's suffrage referendum passes both houses and waits to be passed again the next year.
1881

 The women's suffrage bill, passed in 1880, fails during the second vote.

1882

 September 7: State suffrage convention is held in Madison. The  WSAW changes their name to the Wisconsin Woman Suffrage Association (WWSA).
 Centralia Equal Suffrage Association, Grand Rapids Equal Suffrage Association, Milwaukee Olympic Club, Milwaukee South Side Woman Suffrage Association, Whitewater Woman Suffrage Club, and Woman Suffrage Association at Mosinee are founded.

1884

 A bill passes the state legislature, giving women the right to vote for candidates relating to education. 
September: State suffrage club is held in Richland Center.
1885

 State suffrage meeting held in Whitewater.
The suffrage bill passed in 1884 is passed again and will go out to a voter referendum.

1886

 State suffrage meeting is held in Racine.
Fall: Voters approve the women's suffrage referendum, giving women the right to vote in education-related elections.

1887

 April: Attorney General of Wisconsin, Charles E. Estabrook instructs inspectors at polling places to throw out women's votes.
Olympia Brown is turned away from voting in municipal elections.
State suffrage meeting is held in Madison.
Suffrage newspaper, the Woman Citizen begins publication.

1888

 January 31: The Wisconsin Supreme Court decides that the new education suffrage law means that women can vote for any candidate on ballots that contain school-related issues.
State suffrage meeting is held in Stevens' Point.
The Supreme Court of the United States reverses the Wisconsin Court, clarifying that women in the state can only vote on school issues, not other candidates.
1889

 Another case challenges the school-election law and women are effectively barred from voting for several years.

1890s 

1890

 Theodora W. Youmans uses the Waukesha Freeman as a platform to encourage women's clubs to form in Waukesha.
State suffrage meeting is held in Berlin.
1891

 State suffrage meeting is held in Menominee.

1892

 State suffrage meeting is held in Richland Center.

1893

 State suffrage meeting is held in Mukwonago.

1894

 State suffrage meeting is held in Racine.

1895

 State suffrage meeting is held in Evansville.

1896

 State suffrage meeting is held in Waukesha.
Ten day suffrage open house is held at Manona Lake Assembly where Anna Howard Shaw speaks to a group of around 4,000 people.

1897

 State suffrage meeting is held in Monroe.

1898

 State suffrage meeting is held in Spring Green.
National suffrage convention held in Madison.

1899

 State suffrage meeting is held in Platteville.

20th century

1900s 

1900

 State suffrage meeting is held in Brodhead.

1901

 Belle Case La Follette lobbies the state legislature to reinstate women's right to vote for school-related candidates and issues.
Women are again allowed to vote on education-related issues because separate school ballot boxes are provided by law.
State women's suffrage convention is held in Brodhead.
1902

 Headquarters for women's suffrage are opened in Madison.
State women's suffrage convention is held in Madison.
April 1: Women in Wisconsin vote again for school related issues on a separate ballot.
1903

 A municipal suffrage bill is introduced in the state legislature, but only gets a small vote.
A full women's suffrage bill passes the state assembly, but not the state senate.
State women's suffrage convention is held in Platteville.

1904

 State women's suffrage convention is held in Janesville.

1905

 The state assembly passes a municipal suffrage bill, but it fails in the state senate.
State women's suffrage convention is held in Milwaukee.

1906

 State women's suffrage convention is held in Madison.

1907

 State women's suffrage convention is held in Madison.

1908

 State women's suffrage convention is held in Madison.
Maud Wood Park tours several Wisconsin colleges and helps set up suffrage groups for college students.

1909

 State women's suffrage convention is held in Madison.
WWSA circulates petitions for a federal women's suffrage amendment and collect more than 18,000 signatures.
A bill for a referendum on women's suffrage passes in the state senate, but fails in the state assembly.

1910s 

1910

 State women's suffrage convention is held in Madison.

1911

 March 31: A suffrage bill passes the state senate.
April 26: The suffrage bill passes the state assembly and will go to the voters as a political referendum in 1912.
 The Political Equality League (PEL) is organized.
Wisconsin Men's League for Women's Suffrage formed.
State women's suffrage convention is held in Racine.
Summer: Campaign headquarters for the vote are set up in Milwaukee.
August 2: State women's suffrage auto tour begins in Milwaukee.

1912

 November 4: The vote for women's suffrage fails in the referendum.

1913

 January: Zona Gale calls for a joint conference of PEL and WWSA.
February 4–5: The joint convention is held in Madison.
A women's suffrage referendum passes in the state legislature, but is voted by the governor.
PEL and WWSA merge and keep the name WWSA.
April 26: La Follett testifies in front of the United States Senate Select Committee on Woman Suffrage.

1914

 June 18–24: A suffrage school is held in Madison.
 December: State suffrage convention is held.
1915

 Several women's suffrage bills are introduced in the state legislature, but are unsuccessful.

1916

 March: A Congressional Conference is held in Milwaukee with Carrie Chapman Catt as featured speaker.
June: Suffragists from Wisconsin march in the Chicago parade.

1917

 A National Woman's Party chapter is founded in Wisconsin.
March 4: Olympia Brown from Wisconsin is one of the suffragists picketing the White House.
A voter referendum bill is introduced in the state senate, but loses in the state assembly.

1919

 February: A bill to allow women to vote in the Presidential elections passes.
June 10: Wisconsin ratifies the 19th Amendment.
June 13: Wisconsin is the first state to complete the ratification process, turning in the papers to the Secretary of State.

1920s 
1920

 March: WWSA dissolves.
The League of Women Voters (LWV) Wisconsin is formed.

See also 

 List of Wisconsin suffragists
 Women's suffrage in Wisconsin
 Women's suffrage in states of the United States
 Women's suffrage in the United States

References

Sources

External links 
 Campaign for Women's Suffrage
Brief Legislative History of the Woman's Suffrage Movement in Wisconsin by J. W. McMullin (September 1915)

Wisconsin suffrage
Timelines of states of the United States
Suffrage referendums